"Gotta Get You Home Tonight" is a 1984 single written by McKinley Horton & Eugene Wilde (credited under his legal name Ronald Broomfield) and performed by Eugene Wilde. The single was produced by Donald Robinson and Michael Forte.

Chart performance
The song hit number 1 on the U.S. R&B chart for a week in early 1985 and also peaked at number 83 on the Billboard Hot 100. Outside the US, "Gotta Get You Home Tonight" went to number 18 in the UK.

Samples
Foxy Brown also sampled this track for her song "Get Me Home", on her 1996 album Il Na Na.

References

1984 singles
Contemporary R&B ballads
1984 songs
Songs written by Eugene Wilde